Carbamino refers to an adduct generated by the addition of carbon dioxide to the free amino group of an amino acid or a protein, such as hemoglobin forming carbaminohemoglobin.

Determining quantity of carboamino in products 
It is possible to determine how much carbamino is formed through the techniques of electron ionization and mass spectrometry. In determining the amount of product by mass spectrometry, a careful set of instructions are followed which allows for the carbamino adducts to be transferred to a vacuum for mass spectrometry. With the separation of the carbamino adducts in the ion sampling process, it should be that the pH does not change. Hence, mass spectrometry and electron ionization are a way to measure how much carbamino adduct there is in comparison to concentration of peptide in a solution.

See also
 Amine gas treating
 Ionic liquids in carbon capture

References

Functional groups
Chemical reactions